Gymnopilus praelaeticolor is a species of mushroom in the family Hymenogastraceae.

Description

Habitat and distribution
Gymnopilus praelaeticolor grows on laurel-oak stumps. It has been found in Florida, in June.

See also

List of Gymnopilus species

References

External links
Gymnopilus praelaeticolor at Index Fungorum

praelaeticolor
Fungi of North America
Taxa named by William Alphonso Murrill